= Karantina, Jeddah =

Karantina is an area in southern Jeddah, Saudi Arabia.

Karantina is considered to be a slum with illegal immigrants and criminal activity. Many African expatriates who illegally entered Saudi Arabia and lower-income Saudis live in Karantina. John R. Bradley, author of Saudi Arabia Exposed: Inside a Kingdom in Crisis, described Kerantina as "a melting pot of colors, cultures, and languages."

Around 2005 illegal substances were sold in Karantina in the streets at all times. Women buy and sell the substances. Bradley stated that this was unusual behavior in a country where trafficking drugs has the death penalty. A government official stated that, as of 2005, each week he received up to seven cases of AIDS in Karantina.
